Crête Sèche (from French: "dry crest") may refer to:

Crête Sèche (Mont Blanc massif), a mountain in Switzerland
Col de Crête Sèche, a mountain pass between Italy and Switzerland
Refuge Crête Sèche, a mountain hut in Italy